The 1921 Giro d'Italia was the ninth edition of the Giro d'Italia, a Grand Tour organized and sponsored by the newspaper La Gazzetta dello Sport. The race was won by the Italian rider Giovanni Brunero of the Legnano team. Second and third respectively were the Italian riders Gaetano Belloni and Bartolomeo Aymo.

During the 5th stage, on the "Altopiano delle Cinquemiglia" (in Abruzzo region), Girardengo suffered a legendary crisis: he got off his bike, drew a cross on the road and said: "Girardengo si ferma qui" (Girardengo stops here).

Participants

Of the 69 riders that began the Giro d'Italia on 25 May, 27 of them made it to the finish in Milan on 12 June. Riders were allowed to ride on their own or as a member of a team. There were three teams that competed in the race: Bianchi-Dunlop, Legnano-Pirelli, and Stucchi-Pirelli.

The peloton was almost completely composed of Italians. The field featured two former Giro d'Italia champions in the three-time winner Carlo Galetti and 1919 winner Costante Girardengo. Other notable Italian riders that started the race included Bartolomeo Aymo, Angelo Gremo, Giovanni Rossignoli, and Giuseppe Santhià.

Final standings

Stage results

General classification

There were 27 cyclists who had completed all ten stages. For these cyclists, the times they had needed in each stage was added up for the general classification. The cyclist with the least accumulated time was the winner.

Other classifications

There were two other classifications contested at the race. A points classification was won Giovanni Brunero and a team classification was won by Bianchi-Dunlop. Giovanni Rossignoli won the prize for best ranked independent rider in the general classification.

References

Notes

Citations

Giro d'Italia by year
Giro Ditalia, 1921
Giro Ditalia, 1921
Giro d'Italia
Giro d'Italia